Dusit Chalermsan (born April 22, 1970) is a Thai football coach and retired professional footballer who played as a Left-back. He is currently manager of Thai League 1 club PT Prachuap.

He played as a defender and scored 14 goals for the Thai national team. He played for the national team between 1996 and 2004.

Playing career

Club career
In 1989, He started to play with Police United. After one season, He moved to BEC Tero Sasana in this club he plays AFC Champions League made him had more reputation for a remarkable ability free-kick, After he is well known in Asia football by playing for Asian All-Star Team to play 2000 Iran vs Asia All-Stars Game. He moved abroad in 1999, to play for Indian NFL side Mohun Bagan. In 2003, he moved once again to become a star in Vietnam with Hoàng Anh Gia Lai, where he helped win the V.League 1 title several times. Dusit was awarded a medal for his contributions to Vietnamese football. After he retired in 2008 he became a football coach.

International career
Dusit Chalermsan played 96 international matches and scored 14 goals for the national team.

Managerial statistics

Honours

Player
Thailand
Asian Games fourth place: 1998, 2002
ASEAN Football Championship (3): 1996, 2000, 2002
Sea Games (4): 1993, 1995, 1997, 1999
King's Cup (2): 1994, 2000
Independence Cup Indonesia (1): 1994

Police Tero
Thai League 1: 2001–02
Mohun Bagan
IFA Shield: 1999
Durand Cup: 2000

Hoang Anh Gia Lai
V.League 1 (2): 2003, 2004

Manager
BG Pathum United
Thai League 1: 2020–21
Thai League 2: 2019

Individual
Thai League 1 Coach of the Month: September 2020, November 2020

References 

1970 births
Living people
Dusit Chalermsan
Dusit Chalermsan
Dusit Chalermsan
Thai expatriate footballers
1996 AFC Asian Cup players
2000 AFC Asian Cup players
Mohun Bagan AC players
Expatriate footballers in India
Thai expatriate sportspeople in Vietnam
Expatriate footballers in Vietnam
Hoang Anh Gia Lai FC players
V.League 1 players
Dusit Chalermsan
Dusit Chalermsan
Association football midfielders
Association football defenders
Dusit Chalermsan
Dusit Chalermsan
Dusit Chalermsan
Dusit Chalermsan
Dusit Chalermsan
Footballers at the 1994 Asian Games
Footballers at the 1998 Asian Games
Footballers at the 2002 Asian Games
Dusit Chalermsan
Southeast Asian Games medalists in football
Competitors at the 1993 Southeast Asian Games
Competitors at the 1995 Southeast Asian Games
Competitors at the 1997 Southeast Asian Games
Competitors at the 1999 Southeast Asian Games
Dusit Chalermsan
Thai expatriate sportspeople in India
Calcutta Football League players